Robert Lehr (20 August 1883 – 13 October 1956) was a German politician (DNVP, CDU). He served as Federal Minister of the Interior from 1950 to 1953 under chancellor Konrad Adenauer.

Early life

Robert Lehr was born on 20 August 1883 in Celle as the third child of Oskar and Clara (Stück) Lehr. His childhood was shaped by his father's involvement in the military as well as his parents' Protestant Pietistic beliefs.

Academia and early political career

Education
Lehr completed his Abitur in 1904 and began studying jurisprudence in Marburg, Berlin, and Bonn. In 1907 he passed his first Staatsexamen in Cologne and received his doctorate from the University of Heidelberg in 1908 with a dissertation on legal liability laws within the German Reich. After completing his referendary and final Staatsexamen Lehr decided to pursue a career in local administration because of the personal autonomy and variety such a position offered. He began working as an assessor for the municipality of Düsseldorf in 1913

Politics
In December 1914 at the age of 31, Lehr was elected department head of the police, in which role he was responsible for controlling the press, surveying food supply, counterespionage, and combating radical forces. He held this position throughout World War I. He moved to a position as head of the finance department in 1919 and worked there until 1924, when he was elected ’’Oberbürgermeister’’ of Düsseldorf. During this time he was able to foster economic success within his city despite the worsening economic conditions in nearby Cologne.

Nazi-era

Arrest
During a board meeting on 12 April 1933, only weeks after the Enabling Act (‘’Ermächtigungsgesetz’’), ‘’Oberbürgmeister’’ Lehr was arrested on charges of bribery and personal gain. He was released from “protective custody” in September 1933 due to a severe sickness. He remained barred from working as a lawyer or professor within Nazi Germany, and remained a private citizen throughout the remainder of the Nazi rule.

Resistance
In 1935, Lehr joined a Düsseldorf resistance group consisting of multiple prominent individuals of the Weimar Era including former Union Secretary Karl Arnold and evangelical lawyer Franz Etzel. The Düsseldorf resistance was connected with multiple other resistance groups throughout the nation, including those led by Jakob Kaiser in Berlin and Heinrich Körner in Bonn. Lehr and his wife remained under intense scrutiny by the Gestapo until the end of World War II.

Post-war
Lehr returned to politics immediately following the war, helping to establish the CDU in 1945. He was named the governor of the North Rhine-Westphalia province by occupying British troops. He belonged to the German Bundestag from 1949 until 1953.

Lehr remained active in other areas of society as well, serving as President of the ‘’Schutzgemeinschaft Deutscher Wald’’, an environmental association, from 1947 until 1956 and acting as the head of the ‘’Marburger Universitätsbund’’ from 1952 until his death. He also served as President of the ‘’Industrial Club of Düsseldorf’’ during this time.

Lehr died on 13 October 1956 at the age of 73 in Düsseldorf.

Further reading
 Kaff, Brigitte (2004). "Robert Lehr." Christliche Demokraten gegen Hitler: Aus Verfolgung und Widerstand zur Union. Ed. Buchstab, Günter; Kaff, Brigitte; Kleinmann, Hans-Otto. Freiburg, Germany: Herder, 2004. p. 337-343. Print.

References

External links
 

1883 births
1956 deaths
People from Celle
People from the Province of Hanover
German Lutherans
German conservatives in the German Resistance
German National People's Party politicians
Members of the Landtag of North Rhine-Westphalia
Members of the Bundestag for North Rhine-Westphalia
Members of the Bundestag 1949–1953
Mayors of Düsseldorf
University of Marburg alumni
University of Bonn alumni
Grand Crosses 1st class of the Order of Merit of the Federal Republic of Germany
Members of the Bundestag for the Christian Democratic Union of Germany
Members of Parlamentarischer Rat
20th-century Lutherans